Adam Lakers Carolla (born May 27, 1964) is an American radio personality, comedian, actor and podcaster. He hosts The Adam Carolla Show, a talk show distributed as a podcast which set the record as the "most downloaded podcast" as judged by Guinness World Records in 2011.

Carolla co-hosted the syndicated radio call-in program Loveline with Drew Pinsky from 1995 to 2005 as well as the show's television incarnation on MTV from 1996 to 2000. He was the co-host and co-creator of the television program The Man Show (1999–2004), and the co-creator and a regular performer on the television show Crank Yankers (2002–2007, 2019–present). He hosted The Adam Carolla Project, a home improvement television program which aired on TLC in 2005 and The Car Show on Speed in 2011.

Carolla has also appeared on the network reality television programs Dancing with the Stars and The Celebrity Apprentice. His book In Fifty Years We'll All Be Chicks debuted on The New York Times Best Seller list in 2010, and his second book, Not Taco Bell Material, also reached The New York Times bestseller status.

Carolla has made numerous guest appearances on political talk shows as a commentator. He hosted a weekly segment, "Rollin' with Carolla", on Bill O'Reilly's The O'Reilly Factor.

Early life
Adam Carolla was born on May 27, 1964, to Jim and Kris (née McCall) Carolla. Some sources list his birthplace as Los Angeles County, California, while others list it as Philadelphia, Pennsylvania.  He grew up in the Los Angeles San Fernando Valley, and his parents separated when he was young. Carolla was not given a middle name by his parents; on his driver's license application he listed his middle name as "Lakers" as a joke. The application was processed without notice. His maternal step-grandfather was screenwriter László Görög. 

Adam was raised in the North Hollywood neighborhood of Los Angeles. He attended Colfax Elementary School, Walter Reed Junior High, and North Hollywood High School. Carolla did not receive his high school diploma until years later as it was held by the school until a library fine was paid. Carolla can be seen paying off the book and receiving his diploma in an episode of his 2005 television show, The Adam Carolla Project.

During his youth, Carolla played Pop Warner football for seven years; he later suggested that being involved in sports saved him from a chaotic home life. During his senior year at North Hollywood High School, Carolla distinguished himself in football. In December 1981, he was named to the First Team Offensive Line, Central Valley League, one of 8 leagues at the time in the LA City Section of the California Interscholastic Federation. In October 2020 he spoke of being recruited by "7 or 8" schools including UC-Davis, Cal Poly Pomona, and Cal Poly San Luis Obispo. 

He began living on his own at the age of 18. He briefly attended Los Angeles Valley College, a community college, where he was placed on academic probation before dropping out to work in a series of jobs, including carpet cleaner, carpenter, boxing instructor, and traffic school instructor. Although broke, Carolla, his friends, and roommates owned a 1963 Cadillac limousine.

In the early 1990s, Carolla studied improvisational comedy with The Groundlings and was a member of the ACME Comedy Theatre troupe.

Radio
In 1994, Carolla volunteered his services as a boxing trainer to prepare Jimmy Kimmel for a bout being staged by KROQ-FM's morning radio program Kevin and Bean. Kimmel was a regular on the show as "Jimmy the Sports Guy" and he was set to fight another KROQ personality in a boxing exhibition which was being billed as the "Bleeda in Reseda". Carolla parlayed this opportunity into a long-running friendship and business partnership with Kimmel as well as a recurring role on Kevin and Bean as cranky woodshop teacher, Mr. Birchum.

Loveline
In October 1995, after being signed to the William Morris Agency by Mark Itkin, Carolla was offered the job of co-hosting the evening radio call-in show Loveline. His co-hosts were the physician Drew Pinsky ("Dr. Drew") and metal DJ Riki Rachtman. Carolla received the offer after Pinsky heard him on Kevin and Bean (Rachtman left the show the following year.) Loveline was broadcast on KROQ-FM in Los Angeles and was syndicated nationwide on the former Westwood One radio network.

While the format of the program was primarily that of a call-in show wherein listeners would ask questions about sex and relationships, Carolla would often spend much of the show ranting about various topics from fart jokes to extended parodies of radio morning shows, including mocking the format's penchant for useless and repetitive weather and traffic reports. In contrast to the reserved, thoughtful Pinsky, Carolla served as the loud, funny side of the show. Carolla's character was described by one reviewer as "a toned-down version of Howard Stern minus the huge ego".

In a late-2003 Loveline episode, Carolla said that Hawaiians are "dumb", "in-bred", "retarded" people who are among the "dumbest people we have". The comments were met with anger in Hawaii and resulted in Lovelines cancellation on Hawaiian affiliate KPOI.

The Adam Carolla Show

In October 2005, Carolla was announced as the host of a new morning radio show on the Infinity Broadcasting network. His new show would replace the popular syndicated Howard Stern Show (which was moving to satellite radio) in twelve of the 27 markets in which Stern had been broadcast including Los Angeles, Las Vegas, San Francisco, San Diego, Phoenix, and Portland, Oregon. The Adam Carolla Show debuted in January 2006.

In early 2008, actor Gerard Butler sat in and observed Adam Carolla on The Adam Carolla Show in order to prepare for his role in The Ugly Truth as a cynical and crass talk-radio host allegedly based on Carolla.

On February 18, 2009, The Adam Carolla Show was canceled as part of a format switch at KLSX to AMP FM, a new top 40 station. The final show was Friday, February 20, 2009.

Podcasts

The Adam Carolla Podcast

Carolla started a daily podcast on February 23, 2009, at his personal website, which would evolve into the ACE Broadcasting Network. The first Adam Carolla podcast was downloaded more than 250,000 times in the initial 24 hours, and by the third podcast, it was the number one podcast on iTunes in both the U.S. and Canada. During the debut week, the Adam Carolla podcast recorded 1.6 million downloads. In the second week it recorded 2.4 million downloads. By the fourth episode of the second week, featuring former Adam Carolla Show sidekick Dave Dameshek, the show was downloaded more than 500,000 times. Adam stated that bandwidth cost more than $9,000 a month as of May 2009.

At the end of 2009, The Adam Carolla Podcast was selected by iTunes for its end-of-the-year awards as the Best Audio Podcast of 2009.

On the April 4, 2010, episode of The Adam Carolla Show, Carolla referred to Filipino boxer Manny Pacquiao as a "fucking idiot" and said of the Philippines: "They got this and sex tours, that's all they have over there. Get your shit together, Philippines." A spokesman for President Gloria Macapagal Arroyo called Carolla an "ignorant fool". Carolla subsequently apologized via Twitter.

On May 18, 2011, Carolla noted on Jimmy Kimmel Live! that The Adam Carolla Show had taken the Guinness World Record for the most downloaded podcast ever from previous holder Ricky Gervais by receiving 59,574,843 unique downloads from March 2009 to March 16, 2011.

In 2010, Carolla posed for the NOH8 Campaign. In August 2011, Carolla released a podcast where he mocked a petition to the producers of Sesame Street that demanded Bert and Ernie get married on air. He said on air that gay activists should "[j]ust get married, and please shut up" and that "Y.U.C.K." would be more memorable acronym than LGBT, and referring to transgender people he asked: "When did we start giving a shit about these people?" GLAAD characterized the previous remarks by Carolla as offensive, including an assertion that "all things being equal", heterosexual parents make better parents than homosexual parents. Carolla responded: "I'm sorry my comments were hurtful. I'm a comedian, not a politician."

"Patent Troll" Lawsuit
In 2013, Personal Audio filed a patent infringement lawsuit against Lotzi Digital, Inc., producers of The Adam Carolla Show and several other podcasts on the Carolla Digital Network, in the U.S. District Court for the Eastern District of Texas. The suit alleged that owner Adam Carolla and his network of content infringed on Personal Audio's patent 8,112,504.

Using the crowdfunding site FundAnything.com, listeners contributed more than $475,000 (as of August 2014) to support Carolla throughout the legal proceedings.

Personal Audio dropped the lawsuit July 29, 2014, stating that the defendants were not "making significant money from infringing Personal Audio's patents". However, Carolla countersued, having already spent hundreds of thousands of dollars mounting a defense against claims he deemed unfounded. Among claims sought by the countersuit was a request that the initial patent be invalidated. On August 15, 2014, Carolla and Personal Audio filed a joint motion to dismiss after reaching a settlement, the details of which were not made public but included a six-week "quiet period" during which neither party could speak to the media. Both parties' claims were dropped without prejudice and, as such, could be refiled at a later date.

Television

1996 through 2004
From 1996 to 2000, Carolla and Dr. Drew hosted Loveline on MTV, a television version of the radio show. Carolla began his first original television series with The Man Show, along with partner and friend Jimmy Kimmel, on Comedy Central from 1999 to 2003. He left The Man Show at the same time as Kimmel. Carolla has continued his work with Kimmel as a writer and guest on Jimmy Kimmel Live!. He also appeared on an episode of Space Ghost Coast to Coast around this time.

Carolla and partner Daniel Kellison are the heads of Jackhole Productions. The two created the television show Crank Yankers for Comedy Central, which revived the Mr. Birchum character. The show premiered in 2002 on Comedy Central and returned to MTV2 on February 9, 2007, running again until March 30, 2007. The show screened in Australia on SBS Television and The Comedy Channel between 2003 and 2008. The show revived in 2019.

2005 through 2008
From August 2005 to November 2005, Carolla hosted the talk show Too Late with Adam Carolla on Comedy Central.

Also in 2005, Carolla was featured in a home remodeling program called The Adam Carolla Project wherein he and a crew of old friends renovated his childhood home. The 13 episodes aired on the cable channel TLC (The Learning Channel) from October through December 2005. The house was then sold for 1.2 million dollars.

In 2006, Carolla appeared on the special summer series Gameshow Marathon as a celebrity panelist on the Match Game episode.

On the February 18, 2008, broadcast of his radio show, Carolla announced that he would be one of the contestants on the next season of Dancing with the Stars. Later in the broadcast, it was revealed to Carolla that his partner would be Julianne Hough. He was voted off on the April 8, 2008, episode after his performance of the Paso Doble, after incorporating a demonstration of unicycle riding in his dance routine.

Dancing with the Stars performances

On June 16, 2008, Carolla was selected to host a pilot of an American version of the popular BBC show Top Gear for NBC. In December 2008, NBC decided not to pick up the show.

2009 to present
On February 21, 2009, a day after his Los Angeles-based morning radio show was canceled – as part of a format change at KLSX-FM – CBS ordered a comedy pilot, Ace in the Hole, starring Carolla as a husband and father who works as a driving instructor. Carolla created and wrote the pilot with Kevin Hench (Jimmy Kimmel Live!). Carolla stated that Pamela Adlon was to play his wife and Windell Middlebrooks would  play his best friend. During his March 30, 2009, podcast, Carolla briefly described the show as being "All in the Family, essentially", with Carolla playing a similar role to that of Archie Bunker. On the July 23, 2009, episode of the Adam Carolla Podcast, Carolla announced that CBS was not picking up the pilot for the 2009 season, "in any way, shape or form".

On October 22, 2009, it was reported in Variety that Carolla had struck a deal with NBC to produce a half-hour pilot for a sitcom. The report was later confirmed on January 4, 2010, and was the first comedy pilot ordered by NBC for the season. The untitled project, written by Carolla and Kevin Hench, was a single-camera sitcom that starred Carolla as a contractor and father who attempts to rebuild his life after his wife leaves him. Carolla was set to executive produce the NBC project along with frequent collaborators Kimmel and Hench, as well as his agent James "Babydoll" Dixon, Jon Pollack, Gail Berman, Daniel Kellison, and Lloyd Braun. Universal Media Studios, BermanBraun, and Carolla and Jimmy Kimmel's own Jackhole Industries.

On the February 13, 2010, episode of Carolla's CarCast podcast, he revealed that The History Channel had picked up Top Gear US, which NBC had decided against in 2008. On the March 26, 2010, episode of CarCast, Carolla said that he would not be co-hosting Top Gear US because of scheduling conflicts with his NBC sitcom project. In June 2010, Carolla said that his NBC pilot had not been picked up and was now "dead".

Premiering on February 19, 2012, Carolla was also one of the contestants in the 12th season of NBC's The Celebrity Apprentice. He was fired in Week 4, because host Donald Trump perceived that Carolla did not utilize teammate Mario Andretti's car background during a Buick presentation.

In 2022, Carolla competed in season eight of The Masked Singer as "Avocado". He was eliminated on "Comedy Roast Night" alongside Chris Jericho as "Bride".

The Car Show 
Carolla's The Car Show debuted on Speed TV July 13, 2011. Appearing Wednesdays at 10 pm Eastern, it featured Carolla as the host, along with Dan Neil, John Salley, and Matt Farah. It had a format similar to Top Gear, mixing car reviews, tests and humor. The show was initially met with positive reviews from car enthusiasts and comedy fans. Talk show host and comedian Jay Leno called The Car Show, "a lot of fun".
The Car Show was cancelled after one season, after undergoing format changes due to low ratings, as Carolla mentioned on his podcast on January 13, 2012.

Catch a Contractor 
Catch a Contractor is a non-scripted, original series on Spike, hosted by Carolla along with "no-nonsense contractor" Skip Bedell and his wife, investigator Alison Bedell. Together they expose unethical contractors and seek retribution for wronged homeowners.

The show premiered on March 9, 2014, to 1.2 million viewers, the largest audience for a series debut on Spike since Coal in March 2011. The show was cancelled in 2015.

Adam Carolla and Friends Build Stuff Live 
Premiering on Spike TV on March 14, 2017, Adam Carolla and Friends Build Stuff Live features Carolla building projects live and in studio with some of his Hollywood friends, and tackling viewers' home improvement projects via social media.

Voice acting
Carolla has also done voice acting in animation, including Commander Nebula on the Disney animated series Buzz Lightyear of Star Command, Death on Family Guy (replacing Norm Macdonald) and Spanky Ham on Drawn Together. He was also the voice of the éclair police officer, Wynchell, in the Disney film Wreck-It Ralph. In 2008 and 2009, he was the spokesperson for T.G.I. Friday's.

Film
In 2003, he appeared in Windy City Heat as himself. In 2006, Carolla finished work on The Hammer, a semi-autobiographical independent film he co-wrote and co-produced, in which he stars opposite Heather Juergensen. The film is based loosely on his own life and is filmed at a gym he helped build with his co-star, Ozzie, played by Oswaldo Castillo, his friend in real life whom he met while building the gym when they both worked in construction. The film made its world premiere at the 2007 Tribeca Film Festival in New York City and shortly thereafter received a positive review in Variety. The film was released on March 21, 2008. The film is rated 80% on Rotten Tomatoes.

Adam made a short appearance in Jeff Balis' Still Waiting... (a sequel to Waiting...) playing a pick-up artist guru.

Adam helped write an unproduced screenplay for a film entitled Deaf Frat Guy: Showdown at Havasu.

He is the voice of Virgil in the independent short film Save Virgil.

In July 2013, Carolla used crowdfunding for Road Hard; a film he directed and starred in, about the lives of aging road comics. Adam confirmed through a press conference that the film would co-star David Alan Grier, Illeana Douglas, Diane Farr, and Larry Miller. It had limited theatrical release in the United States.  Several minutes of the credits are devoted to listing the names of those who helped crowdfund the film.

Carolla also directed the documentary Winning: The Racing Life of Paul Newman on the 35-year car racing career of Paul Newman. The documentary showcases Newman's racing life as both a prolific driver and owner.

In 2017, Carolla and Dennis Prager began filming No Safe Spaces, a documentary about political correctness at universities.  No Safe Spaces had a limited opening on October 25, 2019, and did well enough to open nationwide on December 6, 2019.

Filmography

Books
Carolla and Drew Pinsky co-wrote (with Marshall Fine) the self-help book The Dr. Drew and Adam Book: A Survival Guide to Life and Love, published in 1998. The book is a compilation of some of the advice the pair compiled while producing Loveline.

In November 2010, Carolla's In Fifty Years We'll All Be Chicks... And Other Complaints from an Angry Middle-Aged White Guy was published by Crown Archetype and debuted at number eight on the New York Times Best Seller list for hardcover non-fiction on November 21, 2010. The book was compiled from rants Carolla had delivered on his radio show and podcast along with some new material and was dictated to and ghost-written by Mike Lynch.

Carolla published a short, illustrated e-book entitled Rich Man, Poor Man in January 2012. The book details some similarities in the experiences of the very rich and the very poor which are not shared by the middle class. The book was illustrated by Michael Narren.

Carolla's book Not Taco Bell Material was published by Crown Archetype on June 12, 2012. 

In President Me: The America That's in My Head, Carolla presents the comedian's fantasy of the United States with him at the helm. When asked in separate interviews, both before and after the book's release, about whether the "if-I-were-king" critique of America was a serious piece, he said it's both: "Well, there's a lot of jokes in it, but you know, it's like... Well, if you have a fat friend you may make a lot of fat jokes about your fat friend, but he's still fat".

In Daddy, Stop Talking!: And Other Things My Kids Want But Won't Be Getting, Carolla writes about modern parenting. Carolla describes what he believes adults must do if they don't want to have to support their kids forever. Carolla uses his own childhood as a cautionary tale, and decries helicopter parenting.

Carolla's book, I'm Your Emotional Support Animal: Navigating Our All Woke, No Joke Culture, was published by Post Hill Press on June 16, 2020.

Carolla's latest book, Everything Reminds Me of Something, was published by Post Hill Press on July 19, 2022.

Views

Religious 
Carolla is an atheist.

Political 
Regarding his political views, Carolla has stated, "I guess I would be Republican, in the sense that I want a secure border, I'm not into the welfare state, I'm not into all those freebie lunch programs. It just kind of demeans people." He goes on to state, however, that he is also in favor of typically liberal causes such as the legalization of marijuana (he is a member of the advisory board of the Marijuana Policy Project) and support for some progressive causes such as "[being] against semi-automatic and automatic weapons. I'm not an NRA guy by any stretch of the imagination. I'd like alternative energy to be explored and electric cars to be used, but I want them to be powered by nuclear power plants." Elsewhere, he has stated, "My feeling is this whole country is founded on the principle of 'If you are not hurting anyone, and you're not fucking with someone else's shit, and you are paying your taxes, you should be able to just do what you want to do.' It's the freedom and the independence." In an interview with Reason TV, Carolla described his views as libertarian.
Carolla expressed his support for Andrew Yang's 2020 presidential run.

Women and comedy 
In June 2012, Carolla gave a printed interview to the New York Post, where among other things he stated that "chicks" are "always the least funny on the writing staff" and that "dudes are funnier than chicks". Carolla's comments were criticized as sexist. Carolla criticized coverage of his comments as over-simplistic and misleading.

Cancel culture 
Carolla said, "If you meet anyone over 45, they'll tell you they got paddled, they got swatted, the teacher would smack them with a ruler. … Paddling a kid sounds pretty outrageous in 2020 and nobody would stand for it. ... But the people who engaged in it at the time when it was common practice or had a context, we don't need to build a time machine so we can cancel-culture them". In an interview with Tucker Carlson, Carolla said that cancel culture is "destroying free speech and killing comedy."

Personal life
On September 28, 2002, Carolla married Lynette Paradise. The couple's twins Natalia and Santino "Sonny" Richard Carolla were born June 7, 2006. Carolla announced in May 2021 that he and Lynette were divorcing after 19 years. He currently lives in La Cañada Flintridge, California.

Carolla was a part owner of Amalfi, an Italian restaurant in Los Angeles, saying, "I own about two percent of it, but I've never seen a penny."

Carolla won the 2013 Pro/Celebrity Race as a professional and the 2012 Pro/Celebrity Race at the Toyota Grand Prix of Long Beach as an amateur. The 2012 race was run on April 14, 2012, and was broadcast on Speed TV. Carolla has previously participated in the race in 2010 and 2003. He finished ninth among 19 racers (fifth among the ten celebrities) in 2010 despite being regarded as a pre-race favorite. He is also a serious automobile collector with over 20 cars. His collection includes several Lamborghinis from the 1960s and early 1970s, including two Miuras (of 764 examples ever produced), one of which he has loaned to the Petersen Automotive Museum in Los Angeles, two 400GT 2+2s (of 247 units produced) and a 1965 350GT (one of 135 built). At least one Ferrari, an Aston Martin, and several vintage race cars round out the collection.

Honors
Carolla and Pinsky received a Sexual Health in Entertainment (SHINE) Award from The Media Project in 2000 for "incorporating accurate and honest portrayals of sexuality" in the talk show category for Loveline.

Asteroid (4535) Adamcarolla is named in his honor.

References

External links

 
 
 Adam Carolla gives his best life advice

1964 births
Living people
20th-century American comedians
21st-century American comedians
20th-century American male actors
21st-century American male actors
American atheists
American football offensive linemen
American libertarians
American male comedians
American male film actors
American male television actors
American male voice actors
American podcasters
American satirists
American talk radio hosts
American television talk show hosts
California Republicans
Comedians from California
Los Angeles Valley College people
Los Angeles Valley Monarchs football players
Participants in American reality television series
People from North Hollywood, Los Angeles
Racing drivers from Los Angeles
Racing drivers from California
Trans-Am Series drivers
The Apprentice (franchise) contestants
North Hollywood High School alumni